The Lyric Theater was a theater on Main St in Stevens Point, Wisconsin.  It was the city's other single screen year round theater.  The present location holds the city's bus transfer station.

History
The Lyric Theater was built in 1916 by John Clifford. At opening it had 499 seats. It closed in 1957 and was demolished around 1964.

In 1962, the Lyric was temporarily reopened for a screening of the 1960 film Krzyżacy (The Teutonic Knights, Polish language with English subtitles).

References 

Cinemas and movie theaters in Wisconsin
Demolished theatres in the United States
Stevens Point, Wisconsin